Thomas Cooley may refer to:

Thomas Cooley (architect) (1740–1784), Irish architect
Thomas F. Cooley (born 1943), American professor of economics at the New York University Stern School of Business
Thomas M. Cooley (1824–1898), Chief Justice of the Michigan Supreme Court
Thomas Benton Cooley (1871–1945), his son, American pediatrician and hematologist
Thomas R. Cooley, United States Navy admiral
Thomas M. Cooley Law School, Michigan